Fort Ross State Historic Park is a historical state park in Sonoma County, California, including the former Russian fur trading outpost of Fort Ross plus the adjacent coastline and native coast redwood forests extending inland. It is located on the northern California coast about 12 miles north of the town of Jenner and 22 miles north of Bodega Bay. Fort Ross, active from 1812 to 1842, was the southernmost settlement in the Russian colonization of the Americas.  The  park was established in 1909. The site is a Sonoma County Historic Landmark.

Fort Ross

Fort Ross was founded by the Russian-American Company in 1812. Most of the Fort's buildings are reproductions. The one original structure remaining from the Russian settlement, the commander's house, is a National Historic Landmark and on the National Register of Historic Places. The California Department of Parks and Recreation as well as many volunteers put extensive efforts into  restoration and reconstruction work in the Fort.

In addition to fishing, hiking, surfing, exploring tide pools, picnicking, whale watching, and bird watching, Fort Ross State Historic Park has become a popular destination for Scuba Diving, some of whom visit Fort Ross Reef. The wreckage of the SS Pomona lies just offshore Fort Ross State Park.

Name
The name Ross is a poetic name for 'Russian.'  It was selected from lots placed at the base of an image of Christ bestowed on the settlement when it was dedicated on September 11, 1812.  The Spanish sometimes called it Presidio Ruso or Presidio de Bodega.

Park access and closures
In 2009 the park was under the risk of being closed due to state budget cuts. Russian ambassador Sergey Kislyak petitioned in  favor of the park, but Governor Arnold Schwarzenegger promised  nothing. On June 22, 2010, a memorandum of understanding between the  Renova Group of Companies and the State of California, and between Renova Group and Fort Ross Conservancy (then the Fort Ross Interpretive Association) was signed in San Francisco in the presence of Russian President Dmitry Medvedev "to affirm a partnership to support and promote the preservation of California's Fort Ross State Historic Park, and to raise  awareness of its historical and cultural  significance." The threatened park closures  were ultimately avoided by cutting hours and maintenance system-wide.

See also
 List of beaches in Sonoma County, California
 List of California state parks
 List of Sonoma County Regional Parks facilities

References

External links 

 Fort Ross State Historic Park
 Fort Ross State Historic Park
 Fort Ross Conservancy
 Commander's House, Fort Ross National Historic Landmark listing

California State Historic Parks
History museums in California
Museums in Sonoma County, California
National Historic Landmarks in the San Francisco Bay Area
Open-air museums in California
Parks in Sonoma County, California
Protected areas established in 1909
Tourist attractions in Sonoma County, California
1909 establishments in California
National Register of Historic Places in Sonoma County, California